Jeff Larimer (born 1 August 1981 in Marietta, Georgia) is an American slalom canoeist who competed at the international level from 2000 to 2014.

At the 2012 Summer Olympics he competed in the C2 event together with Eric Hurd. They did not advance to the semifinals after finishing 12th in the qualifying round. The pair qualified by winning the 2012 Pan American Championship and winning the US trials. His father and Hurd's father were also both competitive canoeists, even training together on the Chattahoochee River.

World Cup individual podiums

1 Pan American Championship counting for World Cup points

References

American male canoeists
1981 births
Living people
Olympic canoeists of the United States
Canoeists at the 2012 Summer Olympics